Burnt Wings is a 1916 British silent drama film directed by Walter West and starring Eve Balfour, Joseph Tozer and Thomas H. MacDonald. It was adapted from the 1909 novel Burnt Wings by Mrs Stanley Wrench. A woman decides to bring up a baby that her husband has had with his mistress.

Cast
 Eve Balfour - Margaret Dennis 
 Joseph Tozer - Paul Westlake 
 Thomas H. MacDonald - Frank Vane 
 Lily Saxby - Lila Stebbing

References

Bibliography
 Low, Rachael. The History of British Film, Volume III: 1914-1918. Routledge, 1997.

External links

1916 films
1916 drama films
British drama films
British silent feature films
1910s English-language films
Films directed by Walter West
Films based on American novels
British black-and-white films
1910s British films
Silent drama films